Pohjala is a Finnish surname. Notable people with the surname include:
Kyllikki Pohjala (1894–1979), Finnish politician and nurse
Toivo Pohjala (1888–1969), Finnish wrestler and harness racing driver
Toivo Topias Pohjala (1931–2018), Finnish agronomist and politician

See also
Aavo Põhjala, president of Estonian Judo Federation
Põhjala Brewery, Estonian craft brewery

Finnish-language surnames